This is a list of Estonian actors.



A

 Argo Aadli (born 1980)
 Viive Aamisepp (born 1936)
 Ott Aardam (born 1980)
 Jüri Aarma (1951–2017)
 Irja Aav (1944–1995)
 Tõnu Aav (1939–2019)
 Evald Aavik (born 1941) 
 Ervin Abel (1929–1984)
 Mari Abel (born 1975)
 Raivo Adlas (born 1940)
 Rein Aedma (born 1952)
 Dajan Ahmet (1962–2006)
 Liisa Aibel (born 1972)
 Ellen Alaküla (1927–2011)
 Martin Algus (born 1973)
 Rudolf Allabert (1939–2011) 
 Theodor Altermann (1885–1915)
 Ago Anderson (born 1972)
 Maria Annus (born 1979)
 Heino Anto (1882–1955)
 Rein Aren (1927–1990)
 Väino Aren (born 1933)
 Ines Aru (born 1939)
 Virve Aruoja (1922–2013)
 Märt Avandi (born 1981)
 Maria Avdjuško (born 1968)

B

Eino Baskin (1929–2015) 
Roman Baskin (1954–2018)

E

 Aleksander Eelmaa (1946–2021) 
 Taavi Eelmaa (born 1971)
 Andrus Eelmäe (born 1956) 
 Lembit Eelmäe (1927–2009) 
 Ivo Eensalu (born 1949)
 Epp Eespäev (born 1961)
 Herta Elviste (1923–2015)
 Andero Ermel (born 1976)
 Ants Eskola (1908–1989)
 Olev Eskola (1914–1990)
 Eda-Ines Etti (born 1981)
 Ita Ever (born 1931)

H

 Juss Haasma (born 1985)
 Johan Hansing (1888–1941) 
 Heikki Haravee (1924–2003)
 Tiit Härm (born 1946)
 Viiu Härm (born 1944)
 Riina Hein (born 1955)
 Kersti Heinloo (born 1976)
 Helle-Reet Helenurm (1944–2003)
 Tiit Helimets (born 1975)
 Evald Hermaküla (1941–2000)
 Valdur Himbek (1925–1991) 
 Katri Horma (born 1967)
 Toomas Hussar (born 1962)

I

 Arvo Iho (born 1949)
 Tanel Ingi (born 1976)
 Kaarel Ird (1909–1986)
 Ingrid Isotamm (born 1979)

J

Merle Jääger (born 1965)
Getter Jaani (born 1993)
Kadri Jäätma (born 1961)
Alisa Jakobi (born 1981)
Peeter Jakobi (1940–2014)
Maarja Jakobson (born 1977)
Jüri Järvet (1919–1995)
Ene Järvis (born 1947)
Mikk Jürjens (born 1987)
Faime Jurno (born 1951)

K

 Ellen Kaarma (1928–1973)
 Epp Kaidu (1915–1976) 
 Piret Kalda (born 1966)
 Hans Kaldoja (1942–2017)
 Hannes Kaljujärv (born 1957) 
 Rasmus Kaljujärv (born 1981)
 Erika Kaljusaar (born 1956)
 Karl Kalkun (1927–1990) 
 Gita Kalmet (born 1959)
 Henrik Kalmet (born 1986)
 Karl-Andreas Kalmet (born 1989)
 Leo Kalmet (1900–1975)
 Madis Kalmet (born 1955)
 Mart Kampus (born 1961)
 Guido Kangur (born 1956)
 Villu Kangur (born 1957)
 Peeter Kard (1940–2006)
 Katrin Karisma (born 1947)
 Feliks Kark (born 1933)
 Tõnu Kark (born 1957)
 Alina Karmazina (born 1981)
 Kirill Käro (born 1975)
 Volli Käro (born 1940)
 Teet Kask (born 1968)
 Ago-Endrik Kerge (1939–2021) 
 Urmas Kibuspuu (1953–1985)
 Kaljo Kiisk (1925–2007)
 Tõnu Kilgas (1954–2021)
 Kaarel Kilvet (1944–2005)
 Virve Kiple (1927–2009) 
 Vallo Kirs (born 1987)
 Maria Klenskaja (1951–2022) 
 Enn Klooren (1940–2011)
 Mati Klooren (1938–2000)
 Katrin Kohv (born 1964)
 Liisi Koikson (born 1983) 
 Kalju Komissarov (1946–2017)
 Luule Komissarov (born 1972)
 Amalie Konsa (1873–1949)
 Aire Koop (born 1957)
 Heikki Koort (1955–2021)
 Alo Kõrve (born 1978)
 Hele Kõrve (born 1980)
 Harry Kõrvits (born 1953)
 Henry Kõrvits (born 1974)
 Enn Kraam (1943–2001)
 Kersti Kreismann (born 1947)
 Jüri Krjukov (1954–1997)
 Kärt Kross (born 1968)
 Piret Krumm (born 1989) 
 Arvo Kruusement (born 1928)
 Risto Kübar (born 1983)
 Arvo Kukumägi (1958–2017) 
 Grete Kuld (born 1989)
 Elle Kull (born 1952)
 Helle Kuningas (1949–2014) 
 Vambola Kurg (1898–1981)
 Voldemar Kuslap (born 1937)
 Lenna Kuurmaa (born 1985)
 Betty Kuuskemaa (1879–1966)
 Kulno Süvalep (1929–1996)

L

 Marta Laan (born 1985)
 Aare Laanemets (1954–2000)
 Lia Laats (1926–2004)
 Väino Laes (born 1951)
 Lauri Lagle (born 1981)
 Silvia Laidla (1927–2012)
 Anu Lamp (born 1958)
 Liis Lass (born 1989)
 Hugo Laur (1893–1977) 
 Piret Laurimaa (born 1971)
 Ants Lauter (1894–1973)
 Kristel Leesmend (born 1968)
 Tarmo Leinatamm (1957–2014)
 Astrid Lepa (1924–2015)
 Margus Lepa (born 1953)
 Andres Lepik (born 1957)
 Mait Lepik (born 1968)
 Kadri Lepp (born 1979)
 Mihkel Lepper (1900–1980)
 Ülle Lichtfeldt (born 1970)
 Rea Lest-Liik (born 1990)
 Ellen Liiger (1918–1987)
 Jörgen Liik (born 1990)
 Mari Lill (born 1945)
 Mari-Liis Lill (born 1983)
 Tiit Lilleorg (1941–2021)
 Liis Lindmaa (born 1988)
 Raine Loo (1945–2020)
 Priit Loog (born 1984)
 Uno Loop (1930–2021)
 Sulev Luik (1954–1997) 
 Vilma Luik (born 1959)
 Ada Lundver (1942–2011)
 Aksella Luts (1905–2005)
 Meta Luts (1905–1958)
 Ain Lutsepp (born 1954)
 Kristjan Lüüs (born 1991)

M

 Ain Mäeots (born 1971)
 Arvi Mägi (born 1949) 
 Laine Mägi (born 1959) 
 Marin Mägi (born 1982)
 Tõnis Mägi (born 1948)
 Andres Mähar (born 1978)
 Riina Maidre (born 1982)
 Andres Maimik (born 1970)
 Tiina Mälberg (born 1970)
 Franz Malmsten (1905–1967)
 Mait Malmsten (born 1972)
 Heino Mandri (1922–1990)
 Anne Margiste (born 1942)
 Marko Matvere (born 1968)
 Eva Meil (1917–2002)
 Helle Meri (born 1949)
 Alfred Mering (1903–1988)
 Helena Merzin-Tamm (born 1972) 
 Leonhard Merzin (1934–1990) 
 Laine Mesikäpp (1917–2012)
 Marje Metsur (born 1941)
 Kaie Mihkelson (born 1948) 
 Carmen Mikiver (born 1964) 
 Mikk Mikiver (1937–2006)
 Tõnu Mikiver (1943–2017) 
 Angelika Mikk (born 1973)
 Madis Milling (1970–2022)
 Mari Möldre (born 1992)
 Felix Moor (1903–1955)
 Meelis Muhu (born 1972) 
 Hilje Murel (born 1975)
 Jüri Müür (1929–1984) 
 Mart Müürisepp (born 1991)

N

 Jüri Nael (born 1975)
 Kaili Närep (born 1970)
 Lauri Nebel (born 1948)
 Eero Neemre (1905–1994)
 Sulev Nõmmik (1931–1992)
 Andres Noormets (born 1963)
 Egon Nuter (born 1955)
 Rudolf Nuude (1909–1980)

O

 Andres Oja (born 1983)
 Dagmar Oja (born 1981)
 Tõnu Oja (born 1958)
 Pääru Oja (born 1989)
 Peeter Oja (born 1960)
 Rein Oja (born 1956)
 Indrek Ojari (born 1977)
 Liina Olmaru (born 1967)
 Margus Oopkaup (born 1959)
 Aksel Orav (1929–2003)
 Õie Orav (born 1934)
 Jaanus Orgulas (1927–2011) 
 Kalju Orro (born 1952)
 Olav Osolin (born 1953) 
 Georg Ots (1920–1975)
 Velda Otsus (1913–2006)
 Bruno O'Ya (1933–2002)

P

 Meelis Pai (born 1968)
 Ester Pajusoo (born 1934)
 Merle Palmiste (born 1970)
 Külli Palmsaar (born 1966)
 Anne Paluver (born 1952)
 Voldemar Panso (1920–1977)
 Endel Pärn (1914–1990) 
 Katrin Pärn (born 1977)
 Lauri Pedaja (born 1987)
 Priit Pedajas (born 1954)
 Helend Peep (1910–2007)
 Terje Pennie (born 1960)
 Ruth Peramets-Püss (1927–2005)
 Lembit Peterson (born 1953)
 Paul Pinna (1884–1949)
 Maiken Pius (born 1985)
 Märt Pius (born 1989)
 Priit Pius (born 1989)
 Saara Pius (born 1990)
 Mirtel Pohla (born 1982)
 Mari Pokinen (born 1988)
 Dan Põldroos (1970–2007)
 Paul Poom (born 1958)
 Salme Poopuu (1939–2017)
 Veiko Porkanen (born 1989)
 Margus Prangel (born 1974)
 Linnar Priimägi (born 1954)
 Jaak Prints (born 1981)
 Ain Prosa (born 1967)
 Liisa Pulk (born 1985)
 Elina Purde (born 1983)
 Pille Pürg (born 1972)
 Eva Püssa (born 1971)
 Eduard Pütsep (1898–1960)
 Väino Puura (born 1951)
 Andres Puustusmaa (born 1971)

R

 Tõnu Raadik (born 1957)
 Andres Raag (born 1970)
 Ilmar Raag (born 1969)
 Kaljo Raag (1892–1967)
 Rita Raave (born 1951)
 Kaarin Raid (1942–2014) 
 Ene Rämmeld (born 1947)
 Kadri Rämmeld (born 1976)
 Meelis Rämmeld (born 1975)
 Leida Rammo (1924–2020)
 Karin Rask (born 1979)
 Maila Rästas (1937–2008)
 Katariina Ratasepp (born 1986)
 Ursula Ratasepp (born 1982)
 Elsa Ratassepp (1893–1972)
 Tõnis Rätsep (born 1947)
 Rita Rätsepp (born 1962)
 Mihkel Raud (born 1969)
 Evi Rauer (1915–2004)
 Salme Reek (1907–1996)
 Anne Reemann (born 1962)
 Leino Rei (born 1972) 
 Liina Reiman (1891–1961) 
 Veljo Reinik (born 1981)
 Elina Reinold (born 1971)
 Elisabet Reinsalu (born 1976)
 Külli Reinumägi (born 1974) 
 René Reinumägi (born 1974)
 Jaan Rekkor (born 1958)
 Ago Roo (born 1946)
 Erik Ruus (born 1962)

S

 Leila Säälik (born 1941)
 Indrek Saar (born 1973)
 Tõnu Saar (1944–2022) 
 Üllar Saaremäe (born 1969)
 Reimo Sagor (born 1987)
 Külliki Saldre (born 1952)
 Helgi Sallo (born 1941)
 Elmar Salulaht (1910–1974)
 Inga Salurand (born 1983)
 Indrek Sammul (born 1972) 
 Evelin Samuel (born 1975)
 Mart Sander (born 1967)
 Andres Särev (1902–1970)
 Kristjan Sarv (born 1979)
 Aleks Sats (1914–1992) 
 Peeter Sauter (born 1962)
 Aino Seep (1925–1982)
 Angelina Semjonova (1960–2011)
 Adeele Sepp (born 1989)
 Ott Sepp (born 1982)
 Lembit Sibul (1947–2001)
 Eili Sild (born 1942)
 Janika Sillamaa (born 1975)
 Rain Simmul (born 1965) 
 Siiri Sisask (born 1968)
 Britta Soll (born 1984)
 Sophie Sooäär (1914–1996)
 Valter Soosõrv (1903–1969)
 Meeli Sööt (born 1937)
 Aarne Soro (born 1974)
 Eero Spriit (born 1949)
 Tiit Sukk (born 1974)
 Arno Suurorg (1903–1960)

T

 Indrek Taalmaa (born 1967)
 Veikko Täär (born 1971)
 Garmen Tabor (born 1968)
 Margus Tabor (born 1962) 
 Andres Tabun (born 1954)
 Aino Talvi (1909–1992)
 Merle Talvik (born 1954)
 Jaak Tamleht (1942–1986) 
 Kiiri Tamm (born 1962)
 Raivo E. Tamm (born 1965) 
 Karin Tammaru (born 1971)
 Peeter Tammearu (born 1964) 
 Kärt Tammjärv (born 1991)
 Ruut Tarmo (1896–1967)
 Jaan Tätte (born 1964)
 Tiina Tauraite (born 1976)
 Lii Tedre (born 1944)
 Külli Teetamm (born 1976)
 Liina Tennosaar (born 1965)
 Sirje Tennosaar (1943–2021)
 Triin Tenso (born 1987)
 Tõnu Tepandi (born 1948)
 Taavi Teplenkov (born 1975) 
 Sulev Teppart (born 1960)
 Klaudia Tiitsmaa (born 1990)
 Eduard Tinn (1899–1968) 
 Olev Tinn (1920–1971)
 Rain Tolk (born 1977)
 Eduard Toman (born 1960)
 Ülle Toming (born 1955)
 Kärt Tomingas (born 1967)
 Taimo Toomast (born 1962)
 Koit Toome (born 1979)
 Mart Toome (born 1980)
 Jaan Tooming (born 1946)
 Harriet Toompere (born 1975)
 Hendrik Toompere Sr. (1946–2008) 
 Hendrik Toompere Jr. (born 1965)
 Hendrik Toompere Jr. Jr. (born 1986)
 Enn Toona (1909–1973)
 Heino Torga (1933–2012) 
 Raivo Trass (1946–2022)
 Ivan Triesault (1898–1980)
 Tambet Tuisk (born 1976)

U

 Väino Uibo (born 1942)
 Albert Üksip (1886–1966)
 Aarne Üksküla (1937–2017)
 Juhan Ulfsak (born 1973) 
 Lembit Ulfsak (1947–2017)
 Ülle Ulla (1934–2016)
 Olli Ungvere (1906–1991)
 Katariina Unt (born 1971)
 Johann Urb (born 1977)
 Toomas Urb (born 1958) 
 Ivo Uukkivi (born 1965)
 Pärt Uusberg (born 1986)
 Jan Uuspõld (born 1973)

V

 Helmut Vaag (1911–1978) 
 Andrus Vaarik (born 1958)
 Marika Vaarik (born 1962)
 Nele-Liis Vaiksoo (born 1984) 
 Liina Vahtrik (born 1972) 
 Arnold Vaino (1900–1960)
 Katrin Välbe (1904–1981)
 Viire Valdma (born 1960)
 Helene Vannari (1948–2022)
 Hilja Varem (born 1934) 
 Sergo Vares (born 1982) 
 Ardo Ran Varres (born 1974)
 Ragne Veensalu (born 1986)
 Kaido Veermäe (born 1971)
 Anne Veesaar (born 1957)
 Ferdinand Veike (1924–2015)
 Martin Veinmann (born 1950)
 Asta Vihandi (1929–1993)
 Juhan Viiding (1948–1995)
 Aarne Viisimaa (1898–1989)
 Vello Viisimaa (1928–1991)
 Kaire Vilgats (born 1976)
 Erna Villmer (1889–1965)
 Märt Visnapuu (born 1962)
 Evelin Võigemast (born 1980) 
 Priit Võigemast (born 1980)
 Peeter Volkonski (born 1954)
 Peeter Volmer (1940–2002) 
 Hannes Võrno (born 1969)
 Silvi Vrait (1951–2013)

Notes

 List of Estonian actors
Estonian
actors